Walter Dabney Blair (June 14, 1877January 11, 1953) was an American architect. He designed several buildings in Charlottesville, Virginia and, with James Edwin Ruthven Carpenter Jr., The Stahlman in Nashville, Tennessee, listed on the National Register of Historic Places.

Early life
Blair was born on June 14, 1877, in Amelia, Virginia, near Richmond. He attended Richmond College, the University of Virginia, the University of Pennsylvania, and the École des Beaux-Arts.

Career
Blair taught Architectural Design at Cornell University in 1903–1904. He designed several buildings on the campus of the University of Virginia as well as the public library in Charlottesville. He also designed the Warner Library in Tarrytown, New York and the Edwin Gould Foundation building in New York City.

With James Edwin Ruthven Carpenter Jr., he designed The Stahlman in Nashville, Tennessee in 1906–1907. It is listed on the National Register of Historic Places.

Personal life and death
Blair was married twice. His first wife was Ethel Gould; his second wife, Elizabeth Hollister Frost, was a poet. He resided in Tarrytown, New York, where died on January 11, 1953.

References

External links
Walter Dabney Blair on Find a Grave

1877 births
1953 deaths
People from Amelia County, Virginia
People from Tarrytown, New York
University of Virginia alumni
University of Pennsylvania alumni
American alumni of the École des Beaux-Arts
Architects from Virginia
Cornell University faculty
20th-century American architects